Millthorpe is a town located between Orange and Blayney in New South Wales, Australia  in the Blayney Shire.
The town was once a major potato growing area and continues to have extensive agricultural activities.  The town was originally called Spring Grove.

Millthorpe is a picturesque, compact and historic village set amidst gently rolling hills. Classified by the National Trust, it has a number of fine historic buildings, as well as cobbled, bluestone-bordered streets, art galleries, gift and antiques shops, a museum, two hotels, restaurants and cafes, a bowling club and motel. Two of the main streets, Victoria (which runs east-west) and Park (north-south), follow the contours of the local topography with a more regularised grid system extending outwards from them. Millthorpe is located 252 km north-west of Sydney and 22 km south of Orange.

The area now known as Millthorpe lies on the traditional lands of the Wiradjuri people.

European settlement of the area began when a government stock station was established in 1823. The town is based upon a land grant originally known as Grove Farm which was made out to convict overseer Charles Booth in 1834. Noted explorer Thomas Mitchell twice stayed there during inland expeditions.

The area developed as a farming centre from 1840 to 1880 with orchards established in the 1860s. Local agriculture received a considerable boost from the arrival of the railway in the 1870s complete with a railway station. A large flour mill was established in 1882. Consequently, in 1884 the town's name was changed from Spring Grove to Millthorpe. Today it is still essentially a service centre to the rich farmlands which surround it.

Millthorpe's commercial area was extended after the depression of the 1890s and many of its largely brick buildings date from that period. The town's decline after World War I means that it was spared redevelopment and so many of its buildings have survived with very little alteration.

Heritage listings
Millthorpe has a number of heritage-listed sites, including:
 Main Western railway: Millthorpe railway station
 27 Victoria Street: Grand Western Lodge

Notable Millthorpians
 Ellen Esther Dawson (1895-1961) - wife of Arthur Stace. Known as Pearl she was brought up in Millthorpe, later moving to Sydney to work as a domestic servant for a medical practitioner. She married Stace in 1942.
 Bluey Wilkinson (1911-1940) - Born in Millthorpe. International speedway rider. 1938 World Champion and 3 time Australian Champion.

Climate

Millthorpe has warm, stormy summers and cold, wet winters with occasional snowfalls. Its great seasonal range approaches that of climates much farther south, due to its far western location.

Notes and references

External links

 
Towns in the Central West (New South Wales)
Blayney Shire